Georgia State Route 141 Connector may refer to:

 Georgia State Route 141 Connector (Atlanta): A connector route within the Buckhead section of Atlanta
 Georgia State Route 141 Connector (Gwinnett County): A connector route within Gwinnett County west of Norcross

141 Connector